is a Rinzai temple in Hakata, Fukuoka, Japan. It was founded by Eisai with support from Minamoto no Yoritomo, and construction was completed in 1195, making it the oldest Zen temple in Japan.

References

Kōjien, 6th edition

Buddhist temples in Fukuoka Prefecture
Buildings and structures in Fukuoka
Tourist attractions in Fukuoka
Religious buildings and structures completed in 1195
1190s establishments in Japan
1195 establishments in Asia